Gene Orloff (June 14, 1921 – March 23, 2009) was an American violinist, concertmaster, arranger, contractor and session musician.

Background
The son of a Russian immigrant violin maker, Orloff would try and get his father's violin down from the piano and try to play it. He was only three at the time. By the time he was five, he was playing recitals in his home city of Boston. Later, he was playing concerts at venues which included performances at Carnegie Hall and with the Boston Symphony. Having won a scholarship at the Curtis Institute of Music, he left due to the schedule and found work as a commercial musician and, on occasion, was working for 15 hours work per day.
 
During his time, the artists that Orloff performed with included Meat Loaf, The Bee Gees, Aretha Franklin, Frank Sinatra and Barbra Streisand. Orloff's daughter Marcy said that one of his favorites was Van McCoy.

Career
In the late 1940s, he was in Neal Hefti's orchestra, together with, among others, Curley Russell, Shelley Manne and Flip Phillips, on a recording date backing Charlie Parker, and with Nat King Cole's trio/The Muleskinners, backing Woody Herman on vocals.

1970s
Working under Van McCoy's direction, he handled the arrangements for the horns and strings on the Faith Hope & Charity album by Faith Hope and Charity which was released in 1970. Other musicians to play on the album were Richard Tee and Leon Pendarvis on keyboards, guitarists Eric Gale and David Spinozza, bassists Gordon Edwards, percussionists Arthur Jenkins, George Devens and drummer Steve Gadd. He also played on the Disco Baby album by Van McCoy & The Soul City Symphony which was released in 1975 and featured "The Hustle".

Discography
As sideman
1947: The Jazz Scene (Verve Records, 1949)
1949: "Mule Train"/"My Baby Just Cares for Me" – Woody Herman with Nat King Cole Trio/The Muleskinners (Capitol)
1955: Ballads – Ben Webster
1955: That Old Feeling - Al Cohn
1955: By George! (Handy, Of Course) - George Handy
1956: The Hawk in Hi Fi – Coleman Hawkins
1957: Stormy Weather – Lena Horne
1958: An Image: Lee Konitz with Strings - Lee Konitz
1958: Jump for Joy – Cannonball Adderley
1959: Late Date with Ruth Brown – Ruth Brown
1959: Jamal at the Penthouse – Ahmad Jamal
1963: The Body & the Soul – Freddie Hubbard
1963: Fusion! Wes Montgomery with Strings – Wes Montgomery
1963: The Alternative Wes Montgomery – Wes Montgomery
1965: Bumpin' – Wes Montgomery
1965: Sarah Vaughan Sings the Mancini Songbook – Sarah Vaughan
1965: The In Instrumentals – Kai Winding
1965: ¡Viva! Vaughan – Sarah Vaughan
1966: Tequila – Wes Montgomery 	
1966: The Dissection and Reconstruction of Music from the Past as Performed by the Inmates of Lalo Schifrin's Demented Ensemble as a Tribute to the Memory of the Marquis De Sade – Lalo Schifrin
1967: The Beat Goes On – Herbie Mann 
1967: Wave – Antônio Carlos Jobim
1967: A Day in the Life – Wes Montgomery
1967: Aretha Arrives – Aretha Franklin
1968: Child Is Father to the Man – Blood, Sweat & Tears
1968: Bigger & Better -  David Newman
1968: Down Here on the Ground – Wes Montgomery
1968: Left & Right – Rahsaan Roland Kirk
1968: Once Upon a Dream – The Rascals
1968: Silver Cycles – Eddie Harris
1968: Windmills of My Mind – Grady Tate
1969: I've Gotta Be Me – Tony Bennett
1969: The Many Facets of David Newman - David Newman
1969: Daddy Bug & Friends – Roy Ayers 	
1969: Mr. Blues Plays Lady Soul - Hank Crawford
1969: Dusty in Memphis – Dusty Springfield
1969: First Take – Roberta Flack 
1969: Round Trip – Phil Woods
1969: Who Really Cares – Janis Ian
1969: After the Long Ride Home – Grady Tate
1970: Stone Flute – Herbie Mann
1970: MCMLXX - Ray Bryant 
1970: What a Wonderful World – Louis Armstrong 
1971: First Light – Freddie Hubbard
1971: Gilberto with Turrentine – Astrud Gilberto and Stanley Turrentine 
1971: Nature's Baby – Lena Horne 
1971: Salt Song – Stanley Turrentine 
1971: Sing Me a Song of Songmy – Freddie Hubbard
1971: Wild Horses Rock Steady – Johnny "Hammond" Smith
1972: Prelude – Eumir Deodato
1972: Breeding of Mind – O'Donel Levy
1972: Sunflower – Milt Jackson
1972: Young, Gifted and Black – Aretha Franklin
1972: All the King's Horses – Grover Washington, Jr.
1973: Turtle Bay - Herbie Mann
1973: Bette Midler – Bette Midler 
1974: One – Bob James
1974: Walking Man – James Taylor
1975: Taking Off – David Sanborn
1975: Judith – Judy Collins
1976: Bat Out of Hell – Meat Loaf
1976: Surprises - Herbie Mann (Atlantic)
1976: Dee Dee Bridgewater - Dee Dee Bridgewater (Atlantic)
1976: The Man with the Sad Face - Stanley Turrentine (Fantasy)
1977: Concrete Jungle – David "Fathead" Newman (Prestige)
1977: More Stuff – Stuff
1977: Tailgunner - Jimmy McGriff
1978: C'est Chic – Chic
1979: Spy – Carly Simon
1979: I Love to Dance – Kleeer
1979: Thighs and Whispers –  Bette Midler
1981: What Cha' Gonna Do for Me – Chaka Khan
1987: A Sound Investment – Flip Phillips and Scott Hamilton
1995: Real Time – Richard Tee
1995: Tonin' – The Manhattan Transfer
2001: King of the Beat – Bernard "Pretty" Purdie

References

1921 births
2009 deaths
Musicians from Boston
American jazz violinists
American music arrangers
Jazz arrangers
American conductors (music)
American male conductors (music)
American male violinists
American male jazz musicians
Curtis Institute of Music alumni